Jar-Kyshtak may refer to the following places in Kyrgyzstan:

Jar-Kyshtak, Barpy, a village in Barpy rural community, Suzak District, Jalal-Abad Region
Jar-Kyshtak, Yrys, a village in Yrys rural community, Suzak District, Jalal-Abad Region
Jar-Kyshtak, Alay, a village in Alay District, Osh Region
Jar-Kyshtak, Aravan, a village in Aravan District, Osh Region